Carumonam (INN) is a monobactam antibiotic. It is very resistant to beta-lactamases, which means that it is more difficult for bacteria to break down using β-lactamase enzymes.

References 

Monobactam antibiotics
Thiazoles
Carbamates
Sulfamates